Rank comparison chart of Non-commissioned officer and enlisted ranks for armies/land forces of Lusophone states.

Other ranks

References

Military ranks of Lusophone countries 
Military comparisons